The Fielden Chair of Pure Mathematics is an endowed professorial position in the School of Mathematics, University of Manchester, England.

History
In 1870 Samuel Fielden, a wealthy mill owner from Todmorden, donated £150 to Owens College (as the Victoria University of Manchester was then called) for the teaching of evening classes and a further £3000 for the development of natural sciences at the college. From 1877 this supported the Fielden Lecturer, subsequently to become the Fielden Reader  with the appointment of L. J. Mordell in 1922 and then Fielden Professor  in 1923.  Alex Wilkie FRS  was appointed to the post in  2007.

Holders
Previous holders of the Fielden Chair (and lectureship) are:

 A. T. Bentley			(1876–1880) Lecturer in Pure Mathematics
 J. E. A. Steggall		(1880–1883) Lecturer in Pure Mathematics
 R. F. Gwyther			(1883–1907) Lecturer in Mathematics
 F. T. Swanwick		(1907–1912) Lecturer in Mathematics
 H. R. Hasse			(1912–1918) Lecturer in Mathematics
 George Henry Livens			(1920–1922) Lecturer in Mathematics
 Louis Mordell (1923–1945)
 Max Newman (1945–1964)
 Frank Adams (1964–1971)
 Ian G. Macdonald (1972–1976)
 Norman Blackburn (1978–1994)
 Mark Pollicott (1996–2004)
 Alex Wilkie (2007–)

Related chairs
The other endowed chairs in mathematics at the University of Manchester are the Beyer Chair of Applied Mathematics, the Sir Horace Lamb Chair and the Richardson Chair of Applied Mathematics.

References

Professorships in mathematics
Mathematics education in the United Kingdom
Professorships at the University of Manchester